Bring It On: All or Nothing (previously known as Bring It On Yet Again) is a 2006 American comedy film directed by Steve Rash and starring Hayden Panettiere and Solange Knowles-Smith. It is the third installment in the Bring it On series of films that revolves around high school cheerleading. The film was released direct-to-DVD on August 8, 2006.

This film, which is the second sequel to Bring It On, has a tenuous link to its predecessors, featuring only a similar plot of competing cheerleading teams that have to try something different in order to win. There are no recurring cast members or canonical references to the preceding films. However, the film stylistically refers to its predecessors in that it is the third film in the Bring It On series to open with a choreographed musical number that turns out to be a dream sequence of the protagonist, and like all three films, the end credits feature outtakes and clips of the cast having fun dancing.

Plot
Britney Allen is living the "dream life": she is the cheerleading captain and the girlfriend of Brad Warner, the standout quarterback at Pacific Vista High School, and to top it off, she is one of the richest girls in school.  But when her father loses his job, her perfect life comes crumbling down before her as her and her family are forced to move to Crenshaw Heights, a working-class area, and Britney, being the "white girl," suffers a huge culture shock as she tries to adjust to her new life and finds herself at odds with her new classmates who come from very rough walks of life and believe she is nothing more than an idiotic Barbie. But when Britney proves them wrong by joining their cheer team, the tension between them is felt both on court and off.

Cast
 Hayden Panettiere as Britney Allen
 Solange Knowles-Smith as Camille
 Marcy Rylan as Winnie Harper
 Gus Carr as Jesse
 Jake McDorman as Brad Warner
 Giovonnie Samuels as Kirresha
 Francia Raisa as Letícia "Leti" 
 Gary Leroi Gray as Tyson 
 Cindy Chiu as Amber
 Danielle Savre as Brianna
 Jessica Fife as Sierra
 Kiersten Warren as Pamela Allen
 Eric Bruskotter as Timothy Allen
 Rihanna as herself
 Swin Cash as herself
 Hopsin Lunchtime Kid

Reception

Bring It On: All or Nothing received little attention from published movie critics. On review aggregation website Rotten Tomatoes, it has a score of 20% based on reviews from 5 critics.

Soundtrack
 The song for the music video that the team wins the right to perform in is Rihanna's "Pon de Replay". Her song "SOS" is also featured.
 One of the songs featured in the film soundtrack is Gwen Stefani's "Hollaback Girl". The music video for "Hollaback Girl", released in 2004, famously features a cheerleading squad. "What You Waiting For?" and "Rich Girl" another two of Stefani's songs, are also used.
 Fu-Schnickens's "Can We Rock?" is featured as a remix during the end credits. The remix is a mash-up of the song "Can We Rock?" with Hardknox's "What's Up Doc?"
 The title song from Solange Knowles' debut album Solo Star is featured in the movie when the Warriors squad are auditioning.
 The unreleased song "Let's Move" by the film's composers, The Transcenders, is also used in the movie during the Pacific Vista Pirates' practice (with Britney as captain). The Transcenders originally created the song for Garfield: A Tail of Two Kitties, another film they'd worked on that same year.
 "Ready for War" by 50 Cent is featured when Tyson and Jesse teach Britney about krumping.
 "My Happy Ending" by Avril Lavigne is featured twice in the film.
 "Whole Again" by Play is featured.
 Weezer's "Beverly Hills" is also featured.
 "Dirty Little Secret" by All American Rejects is also featured.
 Alana Stone "On" My "Owm" were there  Pacific Vista homecoming dance, where Britney and Brad are dancing.
 Hayden Panettiere's unreleased song "That Girl" plays throughout the scene where Brad is visiting Britney's house and Britney hides when the pizza delivery guy turns out to be Jesse. In the cast credits Panettiere's surname is misspelt.

References

External links
 
 

2006 direct-to-video films
2006 films
American teen comedy films
American direct-to-video films
2000s teen comedy films
Direct-to-video comedy films
Direct-to-video sequel films
2000s English-language films
Cheerleading films
Bring It On (film series)
Films directed by Steve Rash
Beacon Pictures films
Universal Pictures direct-to-video films
2006 comedy films
Films about race and ethnicity
Films set in California
2000s American films